Michurinsky is a rural locality (a settlement) in Rubtsovsky Selsoviet, Rubtsovsky District, Altai Krai, Russia. The population was 477 as of 2013. There are 4 streets.

Geography 
Michurinsky is located 7 km southwest of Rubtsovsk (the district's administrative centre) by road. Zelyonaya Dubrava is the nearest rural locality.

References 

Rural localities in Rubtsovsky District